Athletics at the 2015 Games of the Small States of Europe was held from 2 June to 6 June at the Laugardalsvöllur.

Medal summary

Medal table

Men

Women

Men's results

100 metres

Heats – June 2Wind:Heat 1: +4.6 m/s, Heat 2: +6.6 m/s

Final – June 2Wind:+2.3 m/s

200 metres

Heats – June 6Wind:Heat 1: +0.9 m/s, Heat 2: +1.1 m/s

Final – June 6Wind:+1.7 m/s

400 metres

Heats – June 2

Final – June 4

800 metres
June 2

1500 metres
June 4

5000 metres
June 2

10,000 metres
June 6

110 metres hurdles
June 6Wind: +1.6 m/s

400 metres hurdles
June 4

3000 metres steeplechase
June 6

4 x 100 metres relay
June 6

4 x 400 metres relay
June 6

High jump
June 6

Pole vault
June 2

Long jump
June 4

Triple jump
June 6

Shot put
June 6

Discus throw
June 6

Javelin throw
June 6

Women's results

100 metres
June 2Wind: +2.4 ms

200 metres
June 6Wind: +2.7 ms

400 metres

Heats – June 2

Final – June 4

800 metres
June 2

1500 metres
June 4

5000 metres
June 6

10,000 metres
June 2

100 metres hurdles
June 4Wind: +1.4 ms

400 metres hurdles
June 4

4 x 100 metres relay
June 6

4 x 400 metres relay
June 6

High jump
June 4

Pole vault
June 4

Long jump
June 4

Triple jump
June 6

Shot put
June 6

Discus throw
June 4

Hammer throw
June 4

Javelin throw
June 2

References

External links
 Athletics at the 2015 GSSE Results

Games of the Small States of Europe
Athletics
2015
2015 Games of the Small States of Europe